Qaka ( / ) is a township in Qira County (Chira, Cele), Hotan Prefecture, Xinjiang, China.

History
Qaka Township was established in 1984.

Administrative divisions
Qaka includes twenty villages:

Villages (Mandarin Chinese Hanyu Pinyin-derived names except where Uyghur is provided):
Querushi (Querushicun), Lenguy (Langui, Languicun;  / ), Serikeqiang, Qiaha, Kexi, Kezikudigai, Duweilike, Andi'er, Anba, Ganjisayi, Kangtuokayi, Axi, Yuruketashi, Asa, Ennilike, Kezileyaole, Jiegetale, Wuku, Kalatashi, Hongqi

References

Populated places in Xinjiang
Township-level divisions of Xinjiang